Sciadonic acid, also known as eicosatrienoic acid, is a polyunsaturated fatty acid.  In regard to its structure, 5Z,11Z,14Z-eicosa-5,11,14-trienoic acid (sciadonic acid) has 3 double bonds in the 5, 11, and 14 positions all of which are in the cis- conformation. It is further classified as Δ5-fatty, and an omega-6 acid due to the methylene interrupted double bond at carbon-5 and a final double bond 6 carbons away from the methylene tail of the hydrocarbon. Sciadonic acid is a naturally occurring compound and has been found to play a role as a plant metabolite, commonly found in pine nut oil. Furthermore, there have been propositions of several health applications for sciadonic acid as an anti-inflammatory agent. Sharing close structural similarity to arachidonic acid, sciadonic acid acts as a replacement phospholipid in the corresponding biochemical pathways.

Etymology 
The root behind the nomenclature of sciadonic acid comes from its high abundance in the seed, leaves, and wood oils of the plant species Sciadopitys verticillate.

Synthetic methods 
There are a few methods reagarding the synthesis of sciadonic acid and other Δ5-fatty acids. One method is through desaturase enzyme complexes in which the biosynthesis of sciadonic acid has been achieved in the organism Anemone leveillei via two Δ5-desaturases, AL10 and AL21. Both desaturases have shown success in the synthesis of sciadonic acid, however, the mechanisms show different substrate specificity. AL21 has broad substrate specificity and acts on both saturated (16:0 and 18:0) and unsaturated (20:2, ω-6) fatty acids. In contrast AL10 has a much greater substrate specificity binding only to a C20 unsaturated fatty acid (20:2, n-6) When AL10 is co-expressed with a Δ9-elongase the biosynthesis of sciadonic acid is achieved in transgenic plants. A second synthetic method is achieved through an esterification reaction catalyzed via Lipozyme RM IM and pine nut oil. Lipase-catalyzed esterification reactions leading to the development of Δ5-fatty acids can be achieved in solvent-free conditions using water-jacketed vessel.

Phylogenetic significance in gymnosperms 
Sciadonic acid and several other Δ5-olefinic acids are found to be relatively abundant in gymnosperms. Setaria verticillata seeds and their fatty acid compositions allow for distinction between different Coniferophytes such as species from families such as Cupressaceae and Taxodiaceae. Sciadonic acid is a distinctive fatty acid that shows presence in the oils of seeds, leaves, and woods of conifers. Indicating that plant families can be characterized by the fatty acid composition of their seed, leaves, and wood oils.

Health implications 
Eicosanoids and metabolites found to be biologically active have correlated to tumor progression by several mechanisms such as interruption of cell signaling. In humans, fatty acid desaturases, FADS 1,2 and 3 are enzyme coding genes found in chromosome 11q13, in which alterations can be attributed to several types of cancers such as breast, ovarian and cervical cancer. In particular, the FADS2 enzyme, responsible for Δ6 desaturation is no longer functional. In healthy tissues sciadonic acid is not within detectable concentrations however in human breast cancer tissues detectable concentrations have been found. Sciadonic acids structural similarity has shown potential as a substitute for arachidonic acid in cellular phospholipid pools in the signaling pathways.</ref>  In keratinocytes, sciadonic acids release from the cellular membrane phospholipid pool reduces levels of pro-inflammatory arachidonic acid and the corresponding pro-inflammatory down-stream mediator prostaglandin E2. Reduction of pro-inflammatory mediator molecules is also occurs in murine macrophages, regulating the activation of NF-κΒ and MAPK pathways.

References 

Fatty acids
Polyunsaturated compounds